Rock 'n' Roll Will Never Die is a studio album by the American singer-songwriter Wesley Willis. It was released on 20 February 1996 by Oglio Records, and was the first of Willis' to be released on that label.

Background 
Like the rest of Willis' music, the album was recorded with a 1980's Casio keyboard. Each track features a pre-programmed instrumental with Willis talking over it and then singing or yelling the title of the song as the chorus. This album features mainly songs about famous recording artists that Willis liked or saw in concert, including his band. Every song ends with the phrase "rock over London, rock on Chicago," followed by a random sponsor.

Track listing

Personnel
Wesley Willis - vocals, Technics KN1200 programming, production, songwriting

References

1996 albums
Outsider music albums